Schiffer is a German occupational surname, which means a "boatman", "bargee" or "skipper". Alternative spellings include Schifer and Schiffers. The name may refer to:

András Schiffer (born 1971), Hungarian politician
Adolf Schiffer (1873–1950), Hungarian cellist
Ben Schiffer (born 1983), British writer
Claudia Schiffer (born 1970), German model
Craig Schiffer (born 1956), American businessman
Emanuel Schiffers (1850–1904), Russian chess player and writer
Ervin Schiffer (1932-2015), Hungarian musician
Eugen Schiffer (1860–1954), German politician
Hubert Schiffer (1915–1982), German priest
John Schiffer (1945–2014), American politician
Menahem Max Schiffer (1911–1997), American mathematician
Michael Brian Schiffer (born 1947), American archaeologist
Paul Schiffer (born 1959), American radio host
Roy Schiffer Pinney (1911–2010), American photographer and writer
Sharon Hammes-Schiffer (born 1966), American chemist 
Stephen Schiffer (born 1940), American philosopher

Other uses
Schiffer Publishing, Pennsylvania
Schiffers & Co., Poland

See also
Schaefer
Scheffer
Schieffer
Schiffner

German-language surnames
Jewish surnames
Occupational surnames
Yiddish-language surnames